Lamar Smith may refer to:

 Anthony Lamar Smith, an American man who was killed by a police officer in 2011
 Lamar Smith, American politician from Texas
 Lamar Smith (activist), American civil rights activist murdered in Brookhaven, Mississippi for attempting to bring African-American ballots to the courthouse
 Lamar Smith (American football), American football running back